RCT may refer to:

Science and technology 
 Random conical tilt, a technique used in cryogenic electron microscopy
 Rational choice theory, a framework for understanding social and economic behavior
 Reverse conducting thyristor
 Ritchey–Chrétien telescope
 Rubber Chemistry and Technology, a scientific journal
 Reversible Color Transform, a technique in computer graphics

Medicine 
 Randomized controlled trial, a research method used in medical and social sciences
 Radiochemotherapy, the combination of chemotherapy and radiotherapy to treat cancer
 Root canal treatment, dental treatment to treat nerve damage of the tooth
 Reverse cholesterol transport, pathway by which peripheral cell cholesterol can be returned to the liver for recycling to extrahepatic tissues, hepatic storage, or excretion into the intestine in bile

Organizations 
 Ranipokhari Corner Team, a Nepalese football club
 RC Toulonnais, a rugby union club from Toulon, France
 Register of Clinical Technologists (UK)
 Rehabilitation and Research Centre for Torture Victims
 Rose City Transit, a former mass transit company in Portland, Oregon
 Royal Corps of Transport
 Rural Community Transportation, a public bus system in Vermont

Other uses 
 Rameau Catalogue Thématique, a numbering system used to catalogue the works of Jean-Philippe Rameau
 Regents Competency Test, an alternative standardized test for special education high school students in New York State
 Regimental combat team
 Relational-cultural therapy
 Rhondda Cynon Taf, a county borough in Wales, UK
 RollerCoaster Tycoon, a video game series
 RollerCoaster Tycoon (video game), the first game in the series